Marajó is a large coastal island in the state of Pará, Brazil. It is the main and largest of the islands in the Marajó Archipelago. Marajó Island is separated from the mainland by Marajó Bay, Pará River, smaller rivers (especially Macacos and Tajapuru), Companhia River, Jacaré Grande River, Vieira Grande Bay and Atlantic Ocean.

From approximately 400 BC to 1600 AD, Marajó was the site of an advanced Pre-Columbian society called the Marajoara culture, which may have numbered more than 100,000 people at its peak. Today, the island is known for its large water buffalo population, as well as the pororoca tidal bore periodically exhibited by high tides overcoming the usual complex hydrodynamic interactions in the surrounding rivers. It is the second-largest island in South America, and the 35th largest island in the world.

With a land area of  Marajó is comparable in size to Switzerland.

Geography 
Marajó Island is separated from the mainland by Marajó Bay, Pará River, smaller rivers (especially Macacos and Tajapuru), Companhia River, Jacaré Grande River, Vieira Grande Bay and Atlantic Ocean.

The island sits almost directly on the equator.

The archipelago is contained in the  Marajó Archipelago Environmental Protection Area, a sustainable-use conservation unit established in 1989 to protect the environment of the region.
 
Large parts of the islands are flooded during the rainy season because of higher water levels of the rivers along the coast and heavy rainfall in the interior. Marajó is almost entirely flat. During the rainy season, much of the island becomes flooded as a large lake.

There are 20 large rivers on the island. Because of the changing water levels and regular seasonal flooding, many settlements are built on stilts (Palafitas).

The island is known for the pororoca, a tidal bore phenomenon in the river that creates large waves reaching  in height. It is a tourist destination, especially for surfing of the bore.

Ecology 

The eastern side of the island is dominated by savanna vegetation. There are large fazendas with animal husbandry. There are large herds of domesticated water buffalo, which are technically invasive to the island; they now number about 450,000, higher than the island's human population. The western side of the island is characterized by Várzea forests and small farms. Lumber and açaí are produced there.

The island is in the Marajó várzea ecoregion, an area of seasonally and tidally flooded várzea forest.

To the north of the large savanna area are palm swamps, mainly with Buriti Palm (Mauritia flexuosa) and Euterpe oleracea. During the rainy season, the swamps are flooded one meter high. Little is known about the ecology of these swamps.

Municipalities
The most important towns are in the southeastern portion of the island: Soure, Salvaterra, and the largest city, Breves. They feature a basic touristic infrastructure and are popular because of the generous, lightly populated beaches. The city of Soure, on the island's Atlantic coast, serves as an entry point to the island via its ferry link to Belém.

The island is shared by 16 municipalities of three microregions:

 Microregion of Arari:
 Cachoeira do Arari
 Chaves
 Muaná
 Ponta de Pedras
 Salvaterra
 Santa Cruz do Arari
 Soure
 Microregion of Furos de Breves:
 Afuá
 Anajás
 Breves
 Curralinho
 São Sebastião da Boa Vista
 Microregion of Portel:
 Bagre
 Gurupá
 Melgaço
 Portel

History 

The island was the site of an advanced pre-Columbian society, the Marajoara culture, which existed from approximately 400 BC to 1600 AD. The island has been a center of archaeological exploration and scholarship since the nineteenth century. Scholars from the 1980s forward have divided the pre-Columbian period into the Ananatuba phase (c. 1100–c. 200 BC), the Mangueiras phase (c. 1000 BC–c. 100 AD), the Formiga phase (c. 100-400 AD), the Marajoará phase (c. 400-1200 AD), and the Aruã phase (1200-1500 AD).

Since the 1990s, there has been debate over the origins and sophistication of Marajó's pre-Columbian society. Based on fieldwork in the 1940s and 1950s, the archaeologist Betty Meggers initially argued that the Marajoara culture had been founded by emigrants from the Andes and that the society steadily declined until its final collapse at approximately 1400 AD, due to the Marajó's poor soil fertility and other environmental factors. Megger's hypotheses subsequently became associated with environmental determinism. Her theory has since been rejected, however, by the archaeologist Anna Curtenius Roosevelt, who re-excavated Marajó in the 1980s. According to Roosevelt, the Marajoara culture developed independently within the Amazon and featured both intensive subsistence agriculture and major public works.

Roosevelt estimated that Marajó may have had a population of more than 100,000 people at its peak. The population lived in homes with tamped earth floors, organized themselves into matrilineal clans, and divided tasks by sex, age, and skill level.

The arrival of Europeans in the sixteenth century was catastrophic to the indigenous population of the island; 90% died due to high mortality from Eurasian infectious diseases; they lacked immunity against these diseases that had become endemic in Eurasian cities.

In contrast, however, during the 1918–1919 pandemic worldwide of the Spanish influenza, Marajó was the only major populated area not to have any documented cases of the illness.

The island is also the location of the Roman Catholic Territorial Prelature of Marajó.

References

External links 

 Marajó Island and Pará state at V-Brazil.com

Landforms of Pará
Islands of the Amazon
River islands of Brazil